Dahlgren Township is a rural township in Carver County, Minnesota, United States. The township's economy is based on commercial agriculture around dairying, livestock and cash grain farming. The population was 1,453 as of the 2000 census.

History
Dahlgren Township was organized in 1864, and named for John A. Dahlgren, a United States Navy admiral.

Geography

The west edge of the city of Carver is located within the township geographically but is a separate entity.

Township 115 North, Range 24 West, Fifth Principal Meridian of the Public Land Survey System.

Lakes
 Ave Lake
 E Union Lake
 Gaystock Lake
 Maria Lake (northeast quarter)
 Miller Lake

Adjacent townships
 Laketown Township (north)
 San Francisco Township (south)
 Hancock Township (southwest)
 Benton Township (west)
 Waconia Township (northwest)

Unincorporated communities
 Augusta
 Dahlgren
 East Union

Cemeteries
The township contains five cemeteries: Augustana, German Reformed, Preiss, Saint Nickolas and Swedish Lutheran.

Major highway
  U.S. Highway 212

Demographics

As of the census of 2000, there were 1,453 people, 479 households, and 403 families residing in the township. There were 483 housing units at an average density of 13.6/sq mi (5.3/km). The racial makeup of the township was 98.76% White, 0.21% Native American, 0.34% Asian, 0.14% from other races, and 0.55% from two or more races. Hispanic or Latino of any race were 0.21% of the population.

There were 479 households, out of which 40.7% had children under the age of 18 living with them, 76.8% were married couples living together, 4.8% had a female householder with no husband present, and 15.7% were non-families. 10.6% of all households were made up of individuals, and 3.8% had someone living alone who was 65 years of age or older.  The average household size was 3.03 and the average family size was 3.28.

In the township, the population was spread out, with 29.7% under the age of 18, 6.8% from 18 to 24, 31.2% from 25 to 44, 23.9% from 45 to 64, and 8.4% who were 65 years of age or older.  The median age was 38 years. For every 100 females, there were 110.3 males.  For every 100 females age 18 and over, there were 111.0 males.

The median income for a household in the township was $63,224, and the median income for a family was $68,977. Males had a median income of $41,250 versus $28,477 for females. The per capita income for the township was $23,747.  About 1.0% of families and 2.6% of the population were below the poverty line, including 2.2% of those under age 18 and 4.8% of those ages 65 or over.

Politics

References
 United States National Atlas
 United States Census Bureau 2007 TIGER/Line Shapefiles
 United States Board on Geographic Names (GNIS)

Townships in Carver County, Minnesota
Townships in Minnesota